This article covers the history of women in the United States Senate and various milestones achieved by female senators. It includes a list of all women who have served in the Senate, a list of current female senators, and a list of states represented by women in the Senate. The first female U.S. senator, Rebecca Latimer Felton, represented Georgia for a single day in 1922, and the first woman elected to the Senate, Hattie Caraway, was elected from Arkansas in 1932. Fifty-nine women have served in the upper house of the United States Congress since its establishment in 1789. As of January 3, 2023, there are 25 women (15 Democrats, 9 Republicans, and 1 Independent) serving as U.S. senators.

Nancy Landon Kassebaum is currently the oldest living former female member of the Senate at the age of 90.

History

The first woman to serve in the U.S. Senate was Rebecca Latimer Felton; she represented Georgia for one day in 1922. Ten years later, Hattie Caraway became the first woman to win election to the Senate, representing Arkansas. In 1949, Margaret Chase Smith began her service in the Senate; she was the first woman to serve in both the House and Senate. Her 1960 reelection bid resulted in Chase Smith winning the nation's first-ever United States Senate election with two female major party nominees. In 1972, Elaine Edwards was appointed as the first Catholic woman in the Senate by her husband, the Governor of Louisiana, while she was Louisiana's First Lady; she retired after three months. In 1978, Muriel Humphrey Brown became the first and only Second Lady to serve in the United States Senate, after Hubert Humphrey's unexpected death in office. Humphrey Brown was appointed by the Governor of Minnesota to fill her late husband's Senate seat; she served for less than one year and did not seek to be elected to her husband's seat.

In 1978, Nancy Kassebaum became the first woman ever elected to a full term in the Senate, representing Kansas, without her husband having previously served in Congress. Since 1978, there has always been at least one woman in the Senate. The first woman to be elected to the Senate without any family connections was Florida Republican  Paula Hawkins, elected in 1980. She was also the first and, to date, only female member of the Church of Jesus Christ of Latter-day Saints elected to the United States Senate. In 1990, there were still few women in the Senate as compared to the number of women in the House. The trend of few women in the Senate began to change in the wake of the Clarence Thomas Supreme Court nomination hearings and the subsequent election of the 103rd United States Congress in 1992, which was dubbed the "Year of the Woman." Barbara Mikulski was reelected and four new Democratic women were elected to the Senate. They were Patty Murray of Washington, Carol Moseley Braun of Illinois, Dianne Feinstein of California, and Barbara Boxer of California. Carol Moseley Braun was the first woman of color to serve in the Senate and the first woman to defeat an incumbent senator after she won the 1992 Democratic primary election over Alan Dixon. Later in 1992, Feinstein was the first woman to defeat an incumbent senator from a different party when she defeated John Seymour in a special election. Feinstein entered the Senate the same year as the first female Jewish senator.

Bathroom facilities for women in the Senate on the Senate Chamber level were first provided in 1992. Women were not allowed to wear pants on the Senate floor until 1993. In 1993, Senators Barbara Mikulski and Carol Moseley Braun wore pants onto the floor in defiance of the rule, and female support staff followed soon after, with the rule being amended later that year by Senate Sergeant-at-Arms Martha Pope to allow women to wear pants on the floor so long as they also wore a jacket.

The first time two female senators from the same state served concurrently was beginning in 1993; Dianne Feinstein and Barbara Boxer (both D-CA) were both elected in 1992, with Feinstein taking office that same year (as the result of a special election) and Boxer taking office in 1993; Boxer served until 2016, when she retired, and Feinstein was joined by Kamala Harris. In June 1993, Kay Bailey Hutchison won a special election in Texas, and joined Kassebaum as a fellow female  senator. These additions significantly diminished the popular perception of the Senate as an exclusive "boys' club". Since 1992, there has been at least one new woman elected to the Senate every two years, with the exception of 2004 (Lisa Murkowski was elected for the first time in 2004, but had been appointed to the seat since 2002).

Olympia Snowe of Maine arrived in the Senate in 1995, having previously served in the US House of Representatives and both houses of the Maine state legislature. She and later Debbie Stabenow of Michigan, Kyrsten Sinema of Arizona, and Cynthia Lummis of Wyoming are the only women to have served in both houses of a state legislature and both houses of the federal legislature. In 2000, Stabenow and Maria Cantwell became the first women to defeat incumbent elected senators in a general election, unseating Senators Spencer Abraham and Slade Gorton respectively. Hillary Clinton is the first and only First Lady to run for or win a Senate seat. Clinton joined the Senate in 2001, becoming the first female senator from New York, and served until 2009, when she resigned to become the 67th United States Secretary of State, under President Barack Obama. She was replaced by Kirsten Gillibrand, who has been reelected three times and was herself a candidate for president in the 2020 Democratic Party presidential primaries.

In 2008, Kay Hagan became the first woman to unseat a female incumbent, Elizabeth Dole. Upon the opening of the 112th United States Congress in 2011, New Hampshire Democrat Jeanne Shaheen was joined by newly elected Republican Kelly Ayotte, making up the first Senate delegation of two women belonging to different parties.

In November 2022, Dianne Feinstein became the longest-serving female senator in history. surpassing Barbara Mikulski. having served for 30 years. Feinstein is retiring at the end of her last term on January 3, 2025.

In 2012, a record five new female senators were elected. This beat the record of four new female senators from 1992 and set the record of five new women and eleven female senators in one Senate class. The five new women were Democrats Tammy Baldwin of Wisconsin, Heidi Heitkamp of North Dakota, Mazie Hirono of Hawaii, Elizabeth Warren of Massachusetts, and Republican Deb Fischer of Nebraska. Hirono was the first Asian-American woman and first Buddhist in the Senate, and Baldwin was the first openly gay person in the Senate.

In 2014, Joni Ernst was elected as the first female combat veteran to serve in the Senate. In 2016, Catherine Cortez Masto was elected as the first Latina senator, while Tammy Duckworth was elected as the first female double amputee in the Senate. In a June 2016 primary election, as a result of California's recent establishment of the top-two primary, Attorney General of California Kamala Harris and U.S. Representative Loretta Sanchez became the first women of the same party to advance to a Senate general election. In November 2016, Harris became the first woman to defeat a woman of the same party in a Senate general election. 

In 2016, Hillary Clinton became the first former female senator to win a major party's nomination for President of the United States. Despite winning a plurality of the popular vote, she ultimately lost her bid to Donald Trump.

Starting in 2017, United States Senators Jeanne Shaheen and Maggie Hassan of New Hampshire, have held the distinction of being the first and second women elected as both the governor of a state and a United States senator from a state; both served as Governor of New Hampshire before their time in the Senate.

In 2018, Kyrsten Sinema defeated Martha McSally, becoming Arizona's first female senator, as well as the first openly bisexual senator from any state. Two weeks later, Arizona Governor Doug Ducey announced that he would appoint McSally to Arizona's other Senate seat, which was becoming vacant with the resignation of Jon Kyl. Sinema and McSally have been the only concurrently serving female senators to have previously faced off against each other in a Senate election. McSally exited the Senate in late 2020 after losing that year's special election to Mark Kelly, a Democrat.

Also in 2018, Jacky Rosen made political history as the first female one-term outgoing U.S. representative ever elected to the Senate.

In 2023, Patty Murray became the first woman to serve as president pro tempore, a role traditionally given to the most senior member of the majority party in the United States Senate. Dianne Feinstein was the most senior Democratic senator, but declined to serve. This made Murray the third person in line to become president, after the vice president and the Speaker of the House.

Fifty-nine women have served in the United States Senate since its establishment in 1789. Cumulatively, 35 female U.S. senators have been Democrats, while 23 have been Republicans and one is an independent. As of 2022, no female U.S. senator has ever died in office, won election to the House after her Senate term, resigned from a state governorship for the purpose of a Senate appointment by her successor, also won election as an independent or to represent more than one state in non-consecutive elections, served both seats of a state at different times, switched parties, or represented a third party in her career. However, Kyrsten Sinema has been the first to switch her partisan affiliation while in office as a senator when she did it in December 2022 to become the Senate's first-ever female independent.

Some female U.S. senators have later run for U.S. president or vice president—see list of female United States presidential and vice presidential candidates. In 2020, Kamala Harris became the first female senator, current or past, to win her vice presidential election bid and become the first female President of the United States Senate in American history.

Election, selection, and family
Before 2001, a plurality of women joined the U.S. Senate through appointment following the death or resignation of a husband or father who previously held the seat. An example is Muriel Humphrey (D-MN), the widow of former senator and Vice President Hubert Humphrey; she was appointed to fill his seat until a special election was held (in which she did not run). However, with the election of three women in 2000, the balance shifted; more women have now entered service as a senator by winning elections than by being appointed.

Recent examples of selection include Jean Carnahan and Lisa Murkowski. In 2000, Jean Carnahan (D-MO) was appointed to fill the Senate seat won by her recently deceased husband, Mel Carnahan. Carnahan—even though dead—defeated the incumbent senator, John Ashcroft. Carnahan's widow was named to fill his seat by Missouri Governor Roger Wilson until a special election was held. However, she lost the subsequent 2002 election to fill out the rest of the six-year term. In 2002, Lisa Murkowski (R-AK) was appointed by her father Alaska Governor Frank Murkowski, who had resigned from the Senate to become governor, to serve the remaining two years of his term. Lisa Murkowski defeated former governor Tony Knowles in her retention bid in 2004.

Two recent members of the Senate brought with them a combination of name recognition resulting from the political careers of their famous husbands and their own substantial experience in public affairs. The first, former senator Elizabeth Dole (R-NC), was married to former Senate Majority Leader and 1996 Republican presidential candidate Bob Dole and served as Secretary of Transportation under President Ronald Reagan and Secretary of Labor under President George H.W. Bush; she later ran a losing bid for the Republican presidential nomination in 2000. The other, former senator Hillary Clinton (D-NY), wife of former President Bill Clinton, was First Lady of the United States and First Lady of Arkansas before taking her seat in 2000. She too ran an unsuccessful campaign for her party's presidential nomination in 2008; she resigned in 2009 to become the secretary of state for the eventual victor of that election, Barack Obama. In 2016, she ran a successful campaign for her party's presidential nomination, eventually losing in the general election to Republican nominee Donald Trump.

Another famous name is Nancy Landon Kassebaum (R-KS), the daughter of former Kansas governor and one-time presidential candidate Alf Landon. After retiring from the Senate, she married former senator Howard Baker (R-TN). Kassebaum has the distinction of being the first female elected senator who did not succeed her husband in Congress (Margaret Chase Smith was only elected to the Senate after succeeding her husband to his House seat).

List of female U.S. senators in history

Currently serving women U.S. senators
At the start of the 118th Congress on January 3, 2023, there are 25 women serving in the United States Senate. This is the second-highest number of women to have served concurrently in the Senate in U.S. history. Fifteen are Democrats, nine are Republicans, and one is an independent.

In January 2019, four new women senators (Blackburn, McSally, Rosen, and Sinema) were seated although two others (Heitkamp and McCaskill) lost reelection bids, so the number of female senators reached 25, at the time with 17 being Democrats and 8 being Republicans. In January 2020, Kelly Loeffler was appointed to the Senate from Georgia, increasing the number of women in the Senate to 26, the highest proportion of women serving as U.S. senators in history.

Martha McSally lost an election to finish John McCain's unexpired term on November 3, 2020, and left the Congress on December 2, which reduced the number of female senators to 25. On January 3, 2021, Cynthia Lummis, the first woman senator from Wyoming, began her term, so the number of female senators reached 26 once again. Meanwhile, Kamala Harris was elected Vice President of the United States; she resigned her Senate seat on January 18 in anticipation of the scheduled commencement of her term as Vice President (and thus President of the Senate) on January 20, which reduced the number of female senators to 25. In addition, Loeffler lost the January 5 special election runoff for the remainder of the term to which she had been appointed, and she left office also on January 20, which further reduced the number of women serving in the Senate to 24. On December 9, 2022, Sinema defected from the Democratic Party to become a registered independent, leaving 15 of her fellow women senators from her former party, and on January 3, 2023, Katie Britt, the first Republican woman senator from Alabama and also the first woman ever elected to the Senate from her state, began her term as well, increasing the number to 25 again.

As of January 2023, four states (Minnesota, Nevada, New Hampshire, and Washington) are represented by two female U.S. senators. Eleven incumbent women in the Senate are former U.S. representatives: Senators Stabenow, Cantwell, Gillibrand, Baldwin, Hirono, Moore Capito, Duckworth, Sinema, Rosen, Blackburn, and Lummis.

List of states represented by women
Thirty-three states have been represented by female senators. As of January 2023, 21 states are represented by female senators.

Graphs

Histograph

Timeline

Concurrently serving women from the same state
On January 3, 2019, Arizona's Kyrsten Sinema and Martha McSally became the first women from the same state to start serving in the Senate on the same date.

Elections with two women major party nominees
Incumbent senators are in bold.

Pregnancies
On April 9, 2018, Duckworth gave birth to her daughter Maile Pearl, becoming the first sitting senator to give birth. Shortly afterward, rules were changed so that a senator has the right to bring a child under one year old on the Senate floor and breastfeed him or her during votes. The day after those rules were changed, Maile became the first baby on the Senate floor when Duckworth brought her.

See also
 Women in the United States House of Representatives
 Widow's succession
 List of female governors in the United States
 Party leaders of the United States Senate
Politics of the United States
Sexism in American political elections

Notes

References

External links
 U.S. Senate History: Women in the Senate
 "Women in the U.S. Senate 1922–2010" Center for American Women and Politics, Eagleton Institute of Politics, Rutgers, The State University of New Jersey
 
 Maurer, Elizabeth. "Legislating History: 100 Years of Women in Congress" . National Women's History Museum. 2017.

 
United States Senate
United States Senate
Lists of United States senators